Henning Sirringhaus  is Hitachi Professor of Electron Device Physics, Head of the Microelectronics Group and a member of the Optoelectronics Group at the Cavendish Laboratory. He is also a Fellow of Churchill College at the University of Cambridge.

Education
Sirringhaus was educated at ETH Zürich where he was awarded a Bachelor of Science degree and PhD in physics. From 1995-1996 he worked as a postdoctoral research fellow at Princeton University.

Research
Sirringhaus does research on the charge and spin transport and photophysics of organic semiconductors as well as solution-processible inorganic semiconductors including halide perovskites. Sirringhaus leads an active research group with over 30 members including PhD students and postdoctoral researchers.

Awards and honours
Sirringhaus was elected a Fellow of the Royal Society in 2009, his nomination reads:

References

Living people
ETH Zurich alumni
Fellows of Churchill College, Cambridge
Fellows of the Royal Society
Year of birth missing (living people)